The Tom Taylor Stradivarius is an antique violin made by renowned luthier Antonio Stradivari in Cremona, Italy, circa 1732. Its namesake is British art critic Tom Taylor. Taylor was married to its onetime owner, violinist and composer Laura Wilson Taylor née Barker (1819–1905), who had been presented with the instrument by General Thomas Perronet Thompson during her youth.

It is best known for its use in the recording and appearance in the Canadian film The Red Violin (though the film actually tells the tale of the "Red Mendelssohn" Stradivarius, which has been owned by American violinist Elizabeth Pitcairn since 1990). The Tom Taylor was played by Joshua Bell, who later sold it for $2 million to pay for his current instrument: the Gibson Stradivarius.

The current owner is unknown, and possibly is Mark Steinberg of the Brentano String Quartet, either loaned by Yale Collection of Musical Instruments of the Yale School of Music (Connecticut), or by Mannes School of Music (New York), where he teaches.

The Tom Taylor was previously owned by Patricia Travers (from 1938 to 1954, which was sold to a benefactor who loaned it to California State University, Northridge).

References

1732 works
Stradivari violins
Stradivari instruments